The Ang Mo Kio Group Representation Constituency is a five-member Group Representation Constituency (GRC) in the north eastern region of Singapore. The constituency encompasses the majority of Ang Mo Kio (Teck Ghee, Cheng San-Seletar, portions of Yio Chu Kang), Seletar Hills, the northern half of Serangoon North, a portion of northern Hougang and a portion of Fernvale.  The western portion consists of parts of the Central Catchment Nature Reserve, while in the northeastern corner, it borders the Straits of Johor with two reclaimed islands, Pulau Punggol Barat and Pulau Punggol Timor. The northeast also includes the Sengkang Floating Wetland. This GRC has 5 wards: Teck Ghee, Cheng San- Seletar, Fernvale, Jalan Kayu and Ang Mo Kio-Hougang. The current Members of Parliament are Lee Hsien Loong, Darryl David, Gan Thiam Poh, Ng Ling Ling and Nadia Ahmad Samdin from the People's Action Party (PAP).

Members of Parliament

Balaji died in his sleep on 27 September 2010 due to cancer relapse.

 Yio Chu Kang and Kebun Baru was carved out into Yio Chu Kang SMC and Kebun Baru SMC due to the new electoral boundaries in 2020 and was managed by Yip Hon Weng and Henry Kwek respectively.

 Ang Mo Kio Town Council is operating under Kebun Baru SMC, Yio Chu Kang SMC and Ang Mo Kio GRC.

Candidates and results

Elections in 1990s

Elections in 2000s

Elections in 2010s

Elections in 2020s

References

2020 General Election's result
2015 General Election's result
2011 General Election's result
2006 General Election's result
2001 General Election's result
1997 General Election's result
1991 General Election's result
1988 General Election's result

Singaporean electoral divisions
Ang Mo Kio
Hougang
Seletar
Sengkang
Yishun